The Concarena is a mountain in Lombardy, northern Italy.  It is multi summited and its highest peak is the Cima della Bacchetta, with a height of 2,549 m.

The Concarena divides the mid Val Camonica and the Valle di Scalve, lying at its north-eastern tip (the southern one being the Pizzo Camino). Most of the mountain is located in the province of Brescia, with only the north-western areas part of the province of Bergamo.

Other summits over 2,000 meters include the  Cima dei Ladrinai (2,403 m), Monte Vaccio (2,338 m) and the Corno del Dente (2,303 m).

The mountain is composed of carbonate rocks from the Triassic period (c. 225 million years ago).

SOIUSA classification 

According to the SOIUSA (International Standardized Mountain Subdivision of the Alps) the mountain can be classified in the following way:
 main part = Eastern Alps
 major sector = Southern Limestone Alps
 section = Bergamasque Alps and Prealps
 subsection = Bergamasque Prealps
 supergroup = Prealpi Bergamasche Orientali
 group = Gruppo Camino-Concarena
 subgroup = Gruppo della Concarena
 code = II/C-29.II-C.11.c

References 

Mountains of Lombardy
Mountains of the Alps
Two-thousanders of Italy